The Randolph James House is a historic house at 1212 North Madison Avenue in El Dorado, Arkansas.  The two-story stuccoed house was designed by Mann & Stern, and was built in 1927 for Randolph James by his father George, a principal in the local Exchange Bank who benefited from the city's oil boom in the 1920s.  The house is a fine local example of Spanish Mission Revival styling, with wrought iron balconies, tile roof, stucco walls, and varied windows.

The house was listed on the National Register of Historic Places in 2012.

See also
National Register of Historic Places listings in Union County, Arkansas

References

Houses on the National Register of Historic Places in Arkansas
Houses completed in 1927
Houses in Union County, Arkansas
National Register of Historic Places in Union County, Arkansas
1927 establishments in Arkansas
Buildings and structures in El Dorado, Arkansas
Spanish Revival architecture in Arkansas